Radek Štěpánek was the defending champion, but lost in the semifinals to Jiří Veselý.

Jiří Veselý won the title, defeating Norbert Gombos in the final, 6–2, 6–2.

Seeds

  Radek Štěpánek (semifinals)
  Robin Haase (second round)
  Lukáš Rosol (quarterfinals)
  Mikhail Kukushkin (quarterfinals)
  Bradley Klahn (first round)
  Jiří Veselý (champion)
  Julian Reister (quarterfinals)
  Somdev Devvarman (first round)

Draw

Finals

Top half

Bottom half

External links
 Main Draw
 Qualifying Draw

UniCredit Czech Open - Singles
2014 Singles